FC Feniks-Illichovets Kalinine ( (also Фенікс-Іллічiвець)) was a Ukrainian football club based in Kalinine which is located south-west of Dzhankoy (in the Crimea region).

History
The team was winner of the Crimea championship in 2005, its bronze medallist in 2004 and 2006 and silver medallist of the Ukrainian amateur championship in 2005. In 2006/07 season they played in the Ukrainian Second League (group B), became runners-up and were promoted to the First League.

They participated in the Ukrainian First League until the club folded and withdrew from the competition during the winter break of the 2010–11 Ukrainian First League season.

The club attempted to reform at the end of 2010 as FC Zhemchuzhyna (Perlyna – in Ukrainian), in Yalta, Ukraine but the PFL did not allow for the transfer to occur.

The club's president was Andrey Ryumshin.

League and cup history (Ukraine)

{|class="wikitable"
|-bgcolor="#efefef"
! Season
! Div.
! Pos.
! Pl.
! W
! D
! L
! GS
! GA
! P
!Domestic Cup
!colspan=2|Europe
!Notes
|- align=center bgcolor=SteelBlue
|align=center|2003
|align=center|5th Crimean Championship
|align=center|4/15
|align=center|28
|align=center|17
|align=center|5
|align=center|6
|align=center|43
|align=center|28
|align=center|56
|align=center|
|align=center|
|align=center|
|align=center|
|- bgcolor=SteelBlue
|align=center|2004
|align=center|5th Crimean Championship
|align=center bgcolor=tan|3/15
|align=center|28
|align=center|21
|align=center|2
|align=center|5
|align=center|58
|align=center|30
|align=center|65
|align=center|
|align=center|
|align=center|
|align=center|
|- bgcolor=SteelBlue
|align=center|2005
|align=center|5th Crimean Championship
|align=center bgcolor=gold|1/14
|align=center|26
|align=center|21
|align=center|3
|align=center|2
|align=center|90
|align=center|22
|align=center|66
|align=center|
|align=center|
|align=center|
|align=center bgcolor=lightgreen|Admitted to Amateur League
|- bgcolor=SteelBlue
|align=center|2005
|align=center|4th Amateur League Gr. 2
|align=center bgcolor=gold|1/5
|align=center|6
|align=center|5
|align=center|0
|align=center|1
|align=center|15
|align=center|5
|align=center|15
|align=center|
|align=center|
|align=center|
|align=center bgcolor=lightgreen|Final (2nd, admitted)
|- align=center bgcolor=PowderBlue
|align=center|2006–07
|align=center|3rd Second League Gr. B
|align=center bgcolor=silver|2/16
|align=center|28
|align=center|17
|align=center|6
|align=center|5
|align=center|42
|align=center|22
|align=center|57
|align=center| finals
|align=center|
|align=center|
|align=center bgcolor=lightgreen|Promoted
|- align=center bgcolor=LightCyan
|align=center|2007–08
|align=center|2nd First League
|align=center|16/20
|align=center|38
|align=center|11
|align=center|8
|align=center|19
|align=center|35
|align=center|56
|align=center|41
|align=center| finals
|align=center|
|align=center|
|align=center|
|- bgcolor=LightCyan
|align=center|2008–09
|align=center|2nd First League
|align=center|13/18
|align=center|32
|align=center|9
|align=center|11
|align=center|12
|align=center|33
|align=center|38
|align=center|38
|align=center| finals
|align=center|
|align=center|
|align=center|
|- bgcolor=LightCyan
|align=center|2009–10
|align=center|2nd First League
|align=center|14/18
|align=center|34
|align=center|10
|align=center|7
|align=center|17
|align=center|39
|align=center|52
|align=center|37
|align=center| finals
|align=center|
|align=center|
|align=center|
|- bgcolor=LightCyan
|align=center|2010–11
|align=center|2nd First League
|align=center|18/18
|align=center|34
|align=center|3
|align=center|2
|align=center|29
|align=center|17
|align=center|48
|align=center|8
|align=center| finals
|align=center|
|align=center|
|align=center bgcolor=lightgrey|−3 – withdrew
|}

Head coaches

Honours
Crimea championship (Ukrainian Lower League Tier)
  2005

See also
 FC Yalos Yalta
 FC Zhemchuzhyna Yalta

References

 
Association football clubs established in 2000
Association football clubs disestablished in 2010
Feniks-Illichovets Kalinine
2000 establishments in Ukraine
2010 disestablishments in Ukraine